Below is the list of populated places in İzmir Province, Turkey by district.  The first 21 districts (Aliağa-Urla) are parts of Greater İzmir. In the following lists, the first place in each is the administrative center of the district.

Aliağa 

	Aliağa	
	Aşağışakran, Aliağa
	Bahçedere, Aliağa
	Bozköy, Aliağa
	Çakmaklı, Aliağa
	Çaltılıdere, Aliağa
	Çıtak, Aliağa
	Çoraklar, Aliağa
	Güzelhisar, Aliağa
	Hacıömerli, Aliağa
	Horozgediği, Aliağa
	Kalabak, Aliağa
	Kapukaya, Aliağa
	Karaköy, Aliağa
	Karakuzu, Aliağa
	Samurlu, Aliağa
	Şehitkemal, Aliağa
	Uzunhasanlar, Aliağa
	Yenişakran, Aliağa
	Yüksekköy, Aliağa

Balçova 

	Balçova

Bayındır 

	Bayındır	
	Alankıyı, Bayındır
	Alanköy, Bayındır
	Arıkbaşı, Bayındır
	Balcılar, Bayındır
	Buruncuk, Bayındır
	Çamlıbel, Bayındır
	Çenikler, Bayındır
	Çınardibi, Bayındır
	Çiftçigediği, Bayındır
	Dereköy, Bayındır
	Dernekli, Bayındır
	Elifli, Bayındır
	Ergenli, Bayındır
	Fırınlı, Bayındır
	Gaziler, Bayındır
	Havuzbaşı, Bayındır
	Hisarlık, Bayındır
	Kabaağaç, Bayındır
	Karahalilli, Bayındır
	Karahayıt, Bayındır
	Karapınar, Bayındır
	Kızılcaağaç, Bayındır
	Kızılcaova, Bayındır
	Kızılkeçili, Bayındır
	Kızıloba, Bayındır
	Lütuflar, Bayındır
	Osmanlar, Bayındır
	Pınarlı, Bayındır
	Sarıyurt, Bayındır
	Söğütören, Bayındır
	Tokatbaşı, Bayındır
	Turan, Bayındır
	Yakacık, Bayındır
	Yakapınar, Bayındır
	Yeşilova, Bayındır
	Yusuflu, Bayındır
	Zeytinova, Bayındır

Bayraklı 

	Bayraklı

Bornova 

	Bornova	
	Beşyol, Bornova
	Çamiçi, Bornova
	Çiçekli, Bornova
	Eğridere, Bornova
	Gökdere, Bornova
	Karaçam, Bornova
	Kavaklıdere, Bornova
	Kayadibi, Bornova
	Kurudere, Bornova
	Laka, Bornova
	Sarnıçköy, Bornova
	Yakaköy, Bornova

Buca 

	Buca	
	Belenbaşı, Buca
	Karacaağaç, Buca
	Kırıklar, Buca
	Doğancılar, Buca

Çiğli

 Çiğli

Foça

	Foça	
	Ilıpınar, Foça	
	Kozbeyli, Foça
	Yenibağarası, Foça
	Yeniköy, Foça

Gaziemir

Gaziemir

Güzelbahçe

	Güzelbahçe	
	Çamlı, Güzelbahçe
	Küçükkaya, Güzelbahçe
	Payamlı, Güzelbahçe

Karabağlar

	Karabağlar	
	Kavacık, Karabağlar
	Tırazlı, Karabağlar

Karşıyaka

	Karşıyaka	
	Sancaklı, Karşıyaka
	Yamanlar, Karşıyaka

Kemalpaşa

	Kemalpaşa	
	Akalan, Kemalpaşa
	Ansızca, Kemalpaşa
	Aşağıkızılca, Kemalpaşa
	Bayramlı, Kemalpaşa
	Beşpınar, Kemalpaşa
	Cumalı, Kemalpaşa
	Çambel, Kemalpaşa
	Çınarköy, Kemalpaşa
	Damlacık, Kemalpaşa
	Dereköy, Kemalpaşa
	Hamzababa, Kemalpaşa
	Gökçeyurt, Kemalpaşa
	Gökyaka, Kemalpaşa
	Sarıçalı, Kemalpaşa
	Kamberler, Kemalpaşa
	Kızılüzüm, Kemalpaşa
	Nazarköy, Kemalpaşa
	Kuyucak, Kemalpaşa
	Ovacık, Kemalpaşa
	Sarılar, Kemalpaşa
	Sinancılar, Kemalpaşa
	Sütçüler, Kemalpaşa
       Ulucak, Kemalpaşa
	Vişneli, Kemalpaşa
	Yenikurudere, Kemalpaşa
	Yenmiş, Kemalpaşa
	Yeşilköy, Kemalpaşa
	Yeşilyurt, Kemalpaşa
	Yiğitler, Kemalpaşa
	Zeamet, Kemalpaşa

Konak

Konak

Menderes

	Menderes	
	Akçaköy, Menderes
	Ataköy, Menderes
	Çakaltepe, Menderes
	Çamönü, Menderes
	Çatalca, Menderes
	Çile, Menderes
	Çileme, Menderes
	Develi, Menderes
	Efemçukuru, Menderes
	Gölova, Menderes
	Karakuyu, Menderes
	Keler, Menderes
	Kısık, Menderes
	Kuyucak, Menderes
	Künerlik, Menderes
	Sancaklı, Menderes
	Şaşal, Menderes
	Yeniköy, Menderes

Menemen

	Menemen
	Alaniçi, Menemen
	Ayvacık, Menemen
	Belen, Menemen
	Bağcılar, Menemen
	Bozalan, Menemen
	Çaltı, Menemen
	Çukurköy, Menemen
	Doğa, Menemen
	Göktepe, Menemen
	Görece, Menemen
	Hasanlar, Menemen
	Hatundere, Menemen
	İğnedere, Menemen
	Haykıran, Menemen
	Karaorman, Menemen
	Süleymanlı, Menemen
	Telekler, Menemen
	Turgutlar, Menemen
	Yahşelli, Menemen
	Yanıkköy, Menemen

Narlıdere

Narlıdere

Seferihisar

	Seferihisar	
	Beyler, Seferihisar
	Çamtepe, Seferihisar
	Düzce, Seferihisar
	Gödence, Seferihisar
	İhsaniye, Seferihisar
	Kavakdere, Seferihisar
	Orhanlı, Seferihisar
	Turgut, Seferihisar

Selçuk

	Selçuk	
	Acarlar, Selçuk
	Barutçu, Selçuk
	Belevi, Selçuk
	Çamlık, Selçuk
	Gökçealan, Selçuk
	Havutçulu, Selçuk
	Sultaniye, Selçuk
	Şirince, Selçuk
	Zeytinköy, Selçuk

Torbalı

	Torbalı	
	Ahmetli, Torbalı
	Arslanlar, Torbalı
	Bozköy, Torbalı
	Çakırbeyli, Torbalı
	Çamlıca, Torbalı
	Dağkızılca, Torbalı
	Dağtekke, Torbalı
	Demirci, Torbalı
	Düverlik, Torbalı
	Helvacı, Torbalı
	Kaplancık, Torbalı
	Karakızlar, Torbalı
	Karaot, Torbalı
	Korucuk, Torbalı
	Ormanköy, Torbalı
	Sağlık, Torbalı
	Saipler, Torbalı
	Taşkesik, Torbalı
	Tulum, Torbalı
	Yeniköy, Torbalı
	Yeşilköy, Torbalı
	Yoğurtçular, Torbalı

Urla

	Urla	
	Bademler, Urla
	Balıklıova, Urla
	Barbaros, Urla
	Birgi, Urla
	Demircili, Urla
	Gölcük, Urla
       Gülbahçe, Urla
	Kadıovacık, Urla
	Kuşçular, Urla
	Nohutalan, Urla
	Ovacık, Urla
	Yağcılar, Urla
	Zeytineli, Urla
	Zeytinler, Urla
	Uzunkuyu, Urla

Bergama

	Bergama	
	Ahmetbeyler, Bergama
	Akçenger, Bergama
	Alacalar, Bergama
	Alhatlı, Bergama
	Alibeyli, Bergama
	Armağanlar, Bergama
	Aşağıbey, Bergama
	Aşağıcuma, Bergama
	Aşağıılgındere, Bergama
	Aşağıkırıklar, Bergama
	Atçılar, Bergama
	Avunduk, Bergama
	Avunduruk, Bergama
	Ayaskent, Bergama
	Ayvatalar, Bergama
	Aziziye, Bergama
	Balaban, Bergama
	Bayramcılar, Bergama
	Bekirler, Bergama
	Bozköy, Bergama
	Bozyerler, Bergama
	Bölcek, Bergama
	Cevaplı, Bergama
	Çakırlar, Bergama
	Çalıbahçe, Bergama
	Çaltıkoru, Bergama
	Çamavlu, Bergama
	Çamköy, Bergama
	Çamoba, Bergama
	Çeltikçi, Bergama
	Çitköy, Bergama
	Çobanlar, Bergama
	Çürükbağlar, Bergama
	Dağıstan, Bergama
	Demircidere, Bergama
	Dereköy, Bergama
	Doğancı, Bergama
	Durmuşlar, Bergama
	Eğiller, Bergama
	Eğrigöl, Bergama
	Ferizler, Bergama
	Gaylan, Bergama
	Göbeller, Bergama
	Göçbeyli, Bergama
	Gökçeyurt, Bergama
       Gültepe, Bergama
	Hacıhamzalar, Bergama
	Hacılar (Dereköy), Bergama
	Hacılar (İsmailli), Bergama
	Halilağalar, Bergama
	Hamzalısüleymaniye, Bergama
	Hisarköy, Bergama
	Ilgıncaber, Bergama
	İkizler, Bergama
	İncecikler, Bergama
	İneşir, Bergama
	İsmailli, Bergama
	Kadıköy, Bergama
	Kadriye, Bergama
	Kaleardı, Bergama
	Kapıkaya, Bergama
	Kaplan (Göçbeyli), Bergama
	Kaplan (Yukanbey), Bergama
	Karahıdırlı, Bergama
	Karalar, Bergama
	Karavelilier, Bergama
	Kaşıkçı, Bergama
	Katrancı, Bergama
	Kıranlı, Bergama
	Kırcalar, Bergama
	Kızıltepe, Bergama
	Kocahaliller, Bergama
	Kocaköy, Bergama
	Koyuneli, Bergama
	Kozluca, Bergama
	Kurfallı, Bergama
	Mahmudiye, Bergama
	Maruflar, Bergama
	Muratlar, Bergama
	Narlıca, Bergama
	Okçular, Bergama
	Oruşlar, Bergama
	Ovacık, Bergama
	Öksüzler, Bergama
	Örenli, Bergama
	Örlemiş, Bergama
	Paşaköy, Bergama
	Pınarköy, Bergama
	Pireveliler, Bergama
	Rahmanlar, Bergama
	Sağancı, Bergama
	Sarıcalar, Bergama
	Sarıcaoğlu, Bergama
	Sarıdere, Bergama
	Seklik, Bergama
	Sindel, Bergama
	Süleymanlı, Bergama
	Tavukçukuru, Bergama
	Teğelti, Bergama
	Tekkedere, Bergama
	Tekkeköy, Bergama
	Tepeköy, Bergama
	Terzihaliller, Bergama
	Tırmanlar, Bergama
	Topallar, Bergama
	Üçtepe, Bergama
	Ürkütler, Bergama
	Yalnızdam, Bergama
	Yalnızev, Bergama
	Yenikent, Bergama
	Yeniler, Bergama
	Yerlitahtacı, Bergama
	Yortanlı, Bergama
	Yukarıada, Bergama
	Yukarıbey, Bergama
	Yukarıcuma, Bergama
	Yukarıkırıklar, Bergama
	Zağnoz, Bergama
	Zeytindağ, Bergama

Beydağ

	Beydağ
	Adaküre, Beydağ
	Alakeçili, Beydağ
	Bakırköy, Beydağ
	Çamlık, Beydağ
	Çiftlikköy, Beydağ
	Çomaklar, Beydağ
	Eğridere, Beydağ
	Erikli, Beydağ
	Halıköy, Beydağ
	Karaoba, Beydağ
	Kurudere, Beydağ
	Menderes, Beydağ
	Mutaflar, Beydağ
	Palamutçuk, Beydağ
	Sarıkaya, Beydağ
	Tabaklar, Beydağ
	Yağcılar, Beydağ
	Yeniyurt, Beydağ
	Yeşiltepe, Beydağ
	Yukarıaktepe, Beydağ
	Yukarıtosunlar, Beydağ

Çeşme

	Çeşme	
	Alaçatı, Çeşme
	Germiyan, Çeşme
	Ildır, Çeşme
	Karaköy, Çeşme
	Ovacık, Çeşme

Dikili

	Dikili	
	Bademli, Dikili
	Bahçeli, Dikili
	Çağlan, Dikili
	Çandarlı, Dikili
	Çukuralanı, Dikili
	Deliktaş, Dikili
	Demirtaş, Dikili
	Denizköy, Dikili
	Esentepe, Dikili
	Gökçeağıl, Dikili
	İslamlar, Dikili
	Kabakum, Dikili
	Katıralanı, Dikili
	Kıratlı, Dikili
	Kıroba, Dikili
	Kızılçukur, Dikili
	Kocaoba, Dikili
	Mazılı, Dikili
	Merdivenli, Dikili
	Nebiler, Dikili
	Salihler, Dikili
	Samanlıkköy, Dikili
       Uzunburun, Dikili
	Yahşibey, Dikili
	Yaylayurt, Dikili
	Yenice, Dikili

Karaburun

	Karaburun	
	Anbarseki, Karaburun
	Bozköy, Karaburun
	Eğlenhoca, Karaburun
	Hasseki, Karaburun
	İnecik, Karaburun
	Kösedere, Karaburun
	Küçükbahçe, Karaburun
	Mordoğan, Karaburun
	Parlak, Karaburun
	Saip, Karaburun
	Salman, Karaburun
	Sarpıncık, Karaburun
	Tepeboz, Karaburun
	Yayla, Karaburun

Kınık

	Kınık	
	Arpadere, Kınık
	Arpaseki, Kınık
	Aziziye, Kınık
	Bademalan, Kınık
	Bağalan, Kınık
	Balaban, Kınık
	Büyükoba, Kınık
	Cumalı, Kınık
	Çaltı, Kınık
	Çanköy, Kınık
	Çiftlikköy, Kınık
	Değirmencieli, Kınık
	Dündarlı, Kınık
	Elmadere, Kınık
	Hamzahocalı, Kınık
	Işıklar, Kınık
	İbrahimağa, Kınık
	Kalemköy, Kınık
	Karadere, Kınık
	Karatekeli, Kınık
	Kocaömer, Kınık
	Kodukburun, Kınık
	Köseler, Kınık
	Mıstıklar, Kınık
	Musacalı, Kınık
	Örtülü, Kınık
	Poyracık, Kınık
	Sucahlı, Kınık
	Taştepe, Kınık
	Yayakent, Kınık
	Yaylaköy, Kınık

Kiraz

	Kiraz	
	Ahmetler, Kiraz
	Akpınar, Kiraz
	Altınoluk, Kiraz
	Arkacılar, Kiraz
	Avunduruk, Kiraz
	Aydoğdu, Kiraz
	Bahçearası, Kiraz
	Başaran, Kiraz
	Ceritler, Kiraz
	Cevizli, Kiraz
	Çanakçı, Kiraz
	Çatak, Kiraz
	Çayağzı, Kiraz
	Çömlekçi, Kiraz
	Doğancılar, Kiraz
	Dokuzlar, Kiraz
	Emenler, Kiraz
	Gedik, Kiraz
	Haliller, Kiraz
	Hisar, Kiraz
	İğdeli, Kiraz
	Kaleköy, Kiraz
	Karabağ, Kiraz
	Karabulu, Kiraz
	Karaburç, Kiraz
	Karaman, Kiraz
	Kibar, Kiraz
	Mavidere, Kiraz
	Mersinlidere, Kiraz
	Olgunlar, Kiraz
	Ovacık, Kiraz
	Ören, Kiraz
	Örencik, Kiraz
	Pınarbaşı, Kiraz
	Saçlı, Kiraz
	Sarıkaya, Kiraz
	Sarısu, Kiraz
	Sırımlı, Kiraz
	Solaklar, Kiraz
	Suludere, Kiraz
	Şemsiler, Kiraz
	Taşlıyatak, Kiraz
	Tekbıçaklar, Kiraz
	Tumbullar, Kiraz
	Umurcalı, Kiraz
	Umurlu, Kiraz
	Uzunköy, Kiraz
	Veliler, Kiraz
	Yağlar, Kiraz
	Yeniköy, Kiraz
	Yenişehir, Kiraz
	Yeşildere, Kiraz

Ödemiş

	Ödemiş	
	Alaşarlı, Ödemiş
	Artıcak, Ödemiş
	Bademli, Ödemiş
	Balabanlı, Ödemiş
	Bayırlı, Ödemiş
	Bebekler, Ödemiş
	Beyazıtlar, Ödemiş
	Bıçakçı, Ödemiş
	Birgi, Ödemiş
	Bozcayaka, Ödemiş
	Bozdağ, Ödemiş
	Bucak, Ödemiş
	Bülbüller, Ödemiş
	Büyükavulcuk, Ödemiş
	Cevizalan, Ödemiş
	Çağlayan, Ödemiş
	Çamlıca, Ödemiş
	Çamyayla, Ödemiş
	Çayır, Ödemiş
	Çaylı, Ödemiş
	Çobanlar, Ödemiş
	Demircili, Ödemiş
	Demirdere, Ödemiş
	Dereuzunyer, Ödemiş
	Dolaylar, Ödemiş
	Elmabağ, Ödemiş
	Emirli, Ödemiş
	Ertuğrul, Ödemiş
	Gerçekli, Ödemiş
	Gereli, Ödemiş
	Gölcük, Ödemiş
	Güney, Ödemiş
	Günlüce, Ödemiş
	Hacıhasan, Ödemiş
	Hamam, Ödemiş
	Horzum, Ödemiş
	Işık, Ödemiş
	İlkkurşun, Ödemiş
	Karadoğan, Ödemiş
	Karakova, Ödemiş
	Kayaköy, Ödemiş
	Kaymakçı, Ödemiş
	Kazanlı, Ödemiş
	Kemenler, Ödemiş
	Kemer, Ödemiş
	Kerpiçlik, Ödemiş
	Kışla, Ödemiş
	Kızılca, Ödemiş
	Kızılcahavlu, Ödemiş
	Konaklı, Ödemiş
	Köfündere, Ödemiş
	Köseler, Ödemiş
	Kurucuova, Ödemiş
	Kutlubeyler, Ödemiş
	Küçükavulcuk, Ödemiş
	Küçükören, Ödemiş
	Küre, Ödemiş
	Mescitli, Ödemiş
	Mursallı, Ödemiş
	Ocaklı, Ödemiş
	Oğuzlar, Ödemiş
	Orhangazi, Ödemiş
	Ortaköy, Ödemiş
	Ovacık, Ödemiş
	Ovakent, Ödemiş
	Pirinççi, Ödemiş
	Sekiköy, Ödemiş
	Seyrekli, Ödemiş
	Suçıktı, Ödemiş
	Süleymanlar, Ödemiş
	Şirinköy, Ödemiş
	Tosunlar, Ödemiş
	Türkönü, Ödemiş
	Uzundere, Ödemiş
	Üçkonak, Ödemiş
	Üzümlü, Ödemiş
	Veliler, Ödemiş
	Yeniceköy, Ödemiş
	Yeniköy, Ödemiş
	Yeşilköy, Ödemiş
	Yılanlı, Ödemiş
	Yolüstü, Ödemiş
	Yusufdere, Ödemiş

Tire

	Tire, İzmir
	Akçaşehir, Tire
	Akkoyunlu, Tire
	Akmescit, Tire
	Akyurt, Tire
	Alacalı, Tire
	Alaylı, Tire
	Armutlu, Tire
	Ayaklıkırı, Tire
	Başköy, Tire
	Boynuyoğun, Tire
	Büyükkale, Tire
	Büyükkemerdere, Tire
	Büyükkömürcü, Tire
	Cambazlı, Tire
	Çayırlı, Tire
	Çeriközü, Tire
	Çiniyeri, Tire
	Çobanköy, Tire
	Çukurköy, Tire
	Dağdere, Tire
	Dallık, Tire
	Derebaşı, Tire
	Dereli, Tire
	Dibekçi, Tire
	Doyranlı, Tire
	Dündarlı, Tire
	Eğridere, Tire
	Eskioba, Tire
	Gökçen, Tire
	Halkapınar, Tire
	Hasançavuşlar, Tire
	Hisarlık, Tire
       Işıklar, Tire
       Işıklı, Tire
       Kaplan, Tire
       Karateke, Tire
	Kırtepe, Tire
	Kızılcahavlu, Tire
	Kireli, Tire
	Kocaaliler, Tire
	Kurşak, Tire
	Küçükburun, Tire
	Küçükkale, Tire
	Küçükkemerdere, Tire
	Küçükkömürcü, Tire
	Kürdüllü, Tire
	Mahmutlar, Tire
	Mehmetler, Tire
	Musalar, Tire
	Ortaköy, Tire
	Osmancık, Tire
	Peşrefli, Tire
	Sarılar, Tire
	Saruhanlı, Tire
	Somak, Tire
	Topalak, Tire
	Toparlar, Tire
	Turgutlu, Tire
	Üzümler, Tire
	Yamandere, Tire
       Yeğenli, Tire
       Yemişler, Tire
       Yeniçiftlik, Tire
       Yenioba, Tire
	Yenişehir, Tire

Recent development

According to Law act no 6360, all Turkish provinces with a population more than 750 000, were renamed as metropolitan municipality. All districts in those provinces became second level municipalities and all villages in those districts  were renamed as a neighborhoods . Thus the villages listed above are officially neighborhoods of İzmir.

References

List
Izmir